Damien C. Kurek  (born November 28, 1989) is a farmer from Alberta and a Canadian politician who was elected to represent the riding of Battle River—Crowfoot in the House of Commons of Canada in the 2019 Canadian federal election. He was re-elected in the 2021 election.

He has a degree in political science from Trinity Western University and a diploma in biblical studies. He was raised on a farm near Consort, Alberta.

Career
Prior to his election as Member of Parliament, Kurek worked as a farmer and seasonally in the oil and gas sector. Since a young age he has also been involved in his family's multigenerational farm near Consort, AB. He also served under the riding's previous MP, Kevin Sorenson in Ottawa in 2015 and in the Saskatchewan Legislative Assembly, in various roles while Brad Wall was Premier of Saskatchewan. Up until putting his name forward to become the Conservative candidate for Battle River—Crowfoot, Kurek worked for Hon. Kevin Sorenson in his constituency office in Camrose, Alberta.

Kurek was elected to Parliament in the 2019 general election.

Electoral record

References

External links

Living people
Canadian people of Polish descent
Conservative Party of Canada MPs
Farmers from Alberta
Members of the House of Commons of Canada from Alberta
People from Camrose, Alberta
Trinity Western University alumni
1989 births